The Northern Narragansett Indian Tribe of Rhode Island is an unrecognized tribe in Rhode Island, founded by formerly enrolled members of the federally recognized Narragansett Tribe, who were removed from the tribal rolls in the group removals of 1993 and 2006. The tribe acquired 501(c)(3) status in 2010.

History 
The first group removal of Narragansett tribal members occurred in 1993, where 91 members were removed. Among the removed was the future founder and sachem of the Northern Narragansett, Otis Bliss. In 2006 another 119 were removed, including Yvette Champlain who was a tribal council member at the time. Champlain claims that the removals were based on greed, and were intended to prevent the removed from receiving tribal and federal money. Scholars and activists see this as a national trend among tribes, prompted by a variety of factors, including internal family rivalries and the issue of significant new revenues from Indian casinos. Those who had been removed in 1993 had been petitioning for re-enrollment for the last decade to no avail, and when the 2006 removal occurred, it served as a catalyst for a new tribe to be formed with these newly removed members, in order to attempt to reassert their recognized status as American Indians.

The new tribe was formed in 2006 largely under the leadership of Sachem Bliss. The first tribal meeting was held on November 18, 2006, and the tribe was incorporated on February 15, 2007. The tribe has not been recognized by the federal nor any state government.

Government 
The tribe is headquartered in Providence, Rhode Island. The tribal council, formed in 2007, consists of general councilmen/women, and several different offices: Sachem (occupied by Otis Bliss since founding), First Council, Second Council, Prophet, Medicine Person, and Genealogist.

Membership 
The tribe has about 500 enrolled members. Membership is based on lineal descent from any individual recognized by the tribe as Narragansett. The tribe does not limit its membership solely to descendants of the 1880 Narragansett Roll, unlike the federally recognized tribe. The verification process, although relatively less critical than that of the federally recognized tribe, still takes care to fact check the relationships stated and requires birth certificates as proof.

Most members of the tribe are relatively low income, having been heavily reliant on tribal benefits before their expulsion from the federally recognized tribe. As there are no full blood Narragansett left, tribal members have a large portion of typically either European or African ancestry, along with Narragansett blood.

See also
Tribal disenrollment
Cherokee freedmen controversy
 Nooksack people disenrollment controversy.
Pechanga Band of Luiseño Indians membership and disenrollment
Native American reservation politics

References

Native American tribes in Rhode Island
Narragansett tribe
Indigenous peoples of the Northeastern Woodlands
Algonquian peoples
African–Native American relations
Eastern Algonquian peoples
Unrecognized tribes in the United States